Sofiane Aïssaoui (born August 23, 1991 in Revin) nicknamed "The Lion", is an Algerian-French mixed martial artist competing in the Welterweight division. A professional mixed martial artist since 2017, he was also a French champion of Pancrase.

Background 
Sofiane Aïssaoui nicknamed "The Lion", was born on August 23, 1991 in Revin, his father is a leather worker named Smaïl and his mother who is a nurse named Malika. He has three brothers and a sister, and a daughter named Aliyah.

Sofiane began training judo in 1995 at the age of 4 until the age of 22. Then he discovered MMA at the age of 23.

Mixed martial arts career
As an amateur, he was selected for the French MMA team. He participated in the IMMAF amateur world championship in Las Vegas in July 2015 and the IMMAF European championship in Birmingham in November 2015.

From 2014 to 2016, he was a member of the French MMA team.

In 2016, he became WFC amateur MMA world champion in Milan, then Grappling world champion in May 2018, and won three French championship titles, two in Karate mix and one in Pancrace.

In June 2016, he opened his martial arts and combat sports gym in Reims called Lion Fight Gym.

In 2017, he won his first world belt.

In 2019, according to the 100% FIGHT organization, Sofiane  makes the best submission of the year against Dimitri Henry during the King of Fight.

In 2020, he won the international title of Arena Des Sacres against Ruslan Heleshko.

In 2021, the Ministry of Sports rewards Sofiane Aïssaoui with the bronze medal, for his commitment to sports and associations.

Championships and achievements

 French champion in Pancrase - amateur -
 Twice French champion in Karate Mix -
 European Champion in Luta Livre
 World MMA Champion - amateur WFC (-77 kg)
 WGMA World Grappling Champion (-77 kg)
 Road to Contenders Champion - semi pro (-77 kg)
 Champion of the Arena of Sacres (-77 kg)

Mixed martial arts record

|-
|Win
|align=center|7–4
|Jean Dutriaux
|Submission 
|Hexagone MMA 3
|
|align=center|1
|align=center|
|Reims, French
| 
|-
|Win
|align=center|7–4
|Said Elderbiev
|Submission (Rear-Naked Choke)
|2021 in ONE Championship: Road to ONE: MMA Live 8
|
|align=center|1
|align=center|3:52
|Riesa, Germany
| 
|-
|Loss
|align=center|6–4
|Badreddine Diani
|TKO (Punches)
|UAE Warriors - UAE Warriors 19: Arabia 3
|
|align=center|2
|align=center|1:27
|Abu Dhabi, United Arab Emirates
|  
|-
|Win
|align=center| 6–3
|Ruslan Heleshko
|KO (Body Kick)
|Arene de Sacres 3 - ADS 3
|
|align=center|1
|align=center|2:45
|Reims, France
|
|-
|Win
|align=center|5–3
| Dimitri Henri
|Submission (Armbar)
|100% Fight 39 - King Of Fighting 2019
|
|align=center|1
|align=center|1:10
|Paris, France
|
|- 
|Win
|align=center|4–3
|Romain Debienne
|Submission (Armbar)
|Arene des Sacres 1 - The Genesis
|
|align=center|2
|align=center|3:45
|Reims, France
|
|-
|Loss
|align=center|3–3
|Walid Laidi
|Decision (unanimous)
| 100% Fight 33 - Ascension
|
|align=center|2
|align=center|5:00
|Paris, France
|
|-
|Win
|align=center|3–2
|Said Al Hamid
|Submission (Armbar)
|100% Fight 32 - Way of the Warrior
|
|align=center|1
|align=center|1:29
|Paris, France
|
|-
|Win
|align=center|2–2
|Sami Kodass
| Decision (Unanimous)
|	NXT LVL 2 - Next Level 2
|
|align=center|2
|align=center|5
|Mantes-la-Ville, France
|
|-
|Loss
|align=center|1–2
|Romain Bidet
|Submission (Ankle Lock)
|Knock Out Championship - KOC: Prestige Edition
|
|align=center|1
|align=center|2:19
|Bordeaux, France
|
|-
|Loss
|align=center|1–1
|Abdoul Abdouraguimov
|Submission (Rear-Naked Choke)
|100% Fight - Contenders 33
|
|align=center|1
|align=center|2:21
|Paris, France
|
|-
|Win
|align=center|1–0
|Uriel Loutina
|Decision (unanimous)
|100% Fight - Contenders 33
|
|align=center|2
|align=center|5:00
|Paris, France
|

See also
 List of male mixed martial artists

References

External links
 

1991 births
Living people
French male mixed martial artists
French sportspeople of Algerian descent
Middleweight mixed martial artists
Welterweight mixed martial artists